Shangrin is a village in Doru Shahabad tehsil in Anantnag district in the Indian union territory of Jammu and Kashmir. It is one of 62 villages in Doru Shahabad block, along with villages like Gund Now Roze and Chakpath.

Demographics

Kashmiri is the local language here. People also speak Urdu and Hindi.

References 

Villages in Anantnag district